The 2011 Angola Basketball Super Cup (18th edition) was contested by Primeiro de Agosto, as the 2010 league champion and Recreativo do Libolo, the 2010 cup winner. Primeiro de Agosto was the winner, making it its 10th title.

The 2011 Women's Super Cup (16th edition) was contested by Interclube, as the 2010 women's league champion and Primeiro de Agosto, the 2010 cup runner-up. Interclube was the winner, making it its 4th title.

2011 Men's Super Cup

2011 Women's Super Cup

See also
 2011 Angola Basketball Cup
 2011 BAI Basket
 2011 Victorino Cunha Cup

References

Angola Basketball Super Cup seasons
Super Cup